In electromagnetics, the antenna factor (units: m−1, reciprocal meter) is defined as the ratio of the electric field E (units: V/m or μV/m) to the voltage V (units: V or μV) induced across the terminals of an antenna.

For an electric field antenna, the resulting antenna factor AF is:

 

If all quantities are expressed logarithmically in decibels instead of SI units, the above equation becomes

 

The voltage measured at the output terminals of an antenna is not the actual field intensity due to actual antenna gain, aperture characteristics, and loading effects.

For a magnetic field antenna, the field is in units of A/m and the resulting antenna factor is in units of A/(Vm).  For the relationship between the electric and magnetic fields, see the impedance of free space.

For a 50 Ω load, knowing  that PD Ae = Pr = V2/R and E2= PD ~ 377PD (E and V noted here are the RMS values averaged over time), the antenna factor is developed as:

 

Where
 Ae = (λ2G)/4π : the antenna effective aperture
 PD is the power density in watts per unit area
 Pr is the power delivered into the load resistance presented by the receiver (normally 50 ohms)
 G: the antenna gain
  is the magnetic constant
  is the electric constant

For antennas which are not defined by a physical area, such as monopoles and dipoles consisting of thin rod conductors, the effective length (units: meter) is used to measure the ratio between voltage and electric field.

See also 
 Antenna effective length

Notes

References
 Interpreting Antenna Performance Parameters for EMC Applications
 Interpreting Antenna Performance Parameters for EMC Applications An excellent page with summaries of all the relevant equations
 Antenna Theory

Antennas (radio)